Tovek "Tofik" Dibi (born 19 November 1980 in Vlissingen) is a former Dutch politician for GreenLeft (GroenLinks). He was a Member of Parliament from 30 November 2006 till 19 September 2012. He focused on matters of criminal law, safety, youth, family, and integration.

Biography 
Dibi is of Moroccan descent. He has studied Media and Culture at the University of Amsterdam, specializing in cinema. He combined his study with activities in the Marxist Turkish Workers' Union in the Netherlands ( (HTIB)), and in his own neighborhood Bos en Lommer in Amsterdam. Together with the Trotskyist International Socialists, he initiated the national demonstration Stop Bush! organizing protests when George W. Bush visited the Netherlands in 2005, and the national action committee Enough is Enough, which focused on the discrimination against Muslims.

In September 2006 Dibi unexpectedly came in seventh on the list of GreenLeft for the 2006 general elections and was chosen in the House of Representatives in November 2006. The GreenLeft screening commission called him "a political talent", to Dibi's own amazement, for he had not considered his candidacy all that seriously. At the time he was the youngest member of parliament. Because of his background he concentrated on improving opportunities for young migrant people in the larger cities.

On 13 January 2007 Dibi was arrested and later released while pamphleteering against Dutch politician Geert Wilders with members of the International Socialists. Their posters called Wilders "an extremist" and "harmful to society".

In May 2012 he made public his internal candidacy for heading the GroenLinks list for the September 2012 elections. He lost the internal elections to Jolande Sap, netting 12% of the vote versus Saps 84%. Dibi wasn't re-elected to parliament. After his departure from parliament, he returned to university where he studied until 2014, leaving without a qualification.

He released a memoir, Djinn, in October 2015. The book deals with his struggles with his homosexuality, which he had kept secret during his time as a member of parliament, his Muslim background, and his political career. Djinn was translated into English in 2021.

References 
  Parlement.com biography

1980 births
Living people
Dutch Muslims
Dutch people of Moroccan descent
Dutch relationships and sexuality writers
GroenLinks politicians
Gay politicians
Dutch gay writers
LGBT members of the Parliament of the Netherlands
Members of the House of Representatives (Netherlands)
People from Vlissingen
Gay Muslims
21st-century Dutch politicians